Walvis Bay railway station is a railway station serving the port city of Walvis Bay in Namibia. It is part of the TransNamib railway network.

Overview
The first state railway line in German South West Africa was the connection between Swakopmund and Windhoek, built in 1902 during Imperial Germany's colonial rule. In 1914 this line was extended to Walvis Bay, with a railtrack very close to the shore of the Atlantic Ocean. In 1980 the extension was replaced by an alternative route behind the dunes that allowed for higher axle load.

See also
 Rail transport in Namibia

References

Railway stations in Namibia
1914 establishments in German South West Africa
TransNamib Railway
Buildings and structures in Walvis Bay